Succinea concordialis, common name the spotted ambersnail, is a species of small, air-breathing, land snail, a terrestrial pulmonate gastropod mollusc in the family Succineidae, the amber snails.

Succinea concordialis is partially synonymous to Succinea forsheyi according to Hubrich (1985).

Original description of Succinea concordialis
Succinea concordialis was originally discovered and described by Augustus Addison Gould in Latin language in 1848.

Gould's original text (the type description) reads as follows:

Distribution
This species occurs in the US, in these States: Alabama, Arkansas, Florida, Illinois, Iowa, Kansas, Kentucky, Louisiana, Missouri, Nebraska, New Mexico, North Carolina, Oklahoma, Tennessee, Texas and Wisconsin.

References
This article incorporates public domain text from reference.

 InvertEBase. (2018). Authority files of U.S. and Canadian land and freshwater mollusks developed for the InvertEBase (InvertEBase.org) project.

Further reading
 John K. Tucker. 1977. Succinea witteri Shimek (Gastropoda: Succineidae) in Illinois (Natural history miscellanea). Chicago Academy of Sciences, 7 pages.
 Stevens et al. Oxyloma Taxonomy Draft Final Report. - image of reproductive system of Succinea concordialis at page 18.

External links
 Hubricht. pages 135-136.

Links for Succinea concordialis:
 http://www.gbif.net/species/16181652 - there is under uncorfirmed names as "Succinea concordialis Gould 1851"
 Binney A. & Gould A. A. (ed.) 1851. The terrestrial air-breathing mollusks of the United States, and the adjacent territories of North America Volume II. Boston. Pages 82-83.
 Binney A. & Gould A. A. (ed.) 1857. The terrestrial air-breathing mollusks of the United States, and the adjacent territories of North America Volume III. Plates. Boston. plate LXVII a figure 2.

Succineidae
Gastropods described in 1864